The women's single sculls competition at the 2002 Asian Games in Busan was held from 30 September to 2 October at the Nakdong River.

This rowing event is a single scull event, meaning that each boat is propelled by a single rower. The "scull" portion means that the rower uses two oars, one on each side of the boat; this contrasts with sweep rowing in which each rower has one oar and rows on only one side (not feasible for singles events).

Schedule 
All times are Korea Standard Time (UTC+09:00)

Results 
Legend
DNS — Did not start

Heats 
 Qualification: 1 → Final (FA), 2–4 → Repechage (R)

Heat 1

Heat 2

Repechage 
 Qualification: 1–4 → Final (FA)

Final

References 

2002 Asian Games Official Reports, Pages 546–549
Results

External links 
Official Website

Rowing at the 2002 Asian Games